Sporting Club Quinto is an Italian water polo club from Quinto, quartiere of Genoa in Liguria. Currently it plays in Serie A1.

History 
Sporting Club Quinto was founded in 1921.

Titles

Current team
 Nicolò Scanu
 Federico Accardo
 Armando Turbati
 Giacomo Boero
 Francesco Brambilla
 Andrea Amelio
 Alessandro Brambilla
 Luca Bittarello
 Matteo Spigno
 Srdjan Aksentijevic

Famous players
 Marco Paganuzzi

Famous coaches
 Marco Paganuzzi

References

External links 
 Official website
   

 
Sport in Genoa
Water polo clubs in Liguria
Water polo clubs in Italy
Organisations based in Genoa   
Sports clubs established in 1921